Leptodactylodon bicolor is a species of frog in the family Arthroleptidae.
It is found in Cameroon and Nigeria.
Its natural habitats are subtropical or tropical moist montane forests, rivers, intermittent rivers, rocky areas, and heavily degraded former forest.
It is threatened by habitat loss.

References

Leptodactylodon
Amphibians described in 1971
Taxonomy articles created by Polbot
Fauna of the Cameroonian Highlands forests